Patterson Tract is a census-designated place (CDP) in Tulare County, California. The 2010 United States census reported Patterson Tract's population was 1,752.

Geography
According to the United States Census Bureau, the CDP covers an area of 1.4 square miles (3.7 km), all of it land.

Demographics
At the 2010 census Patterson Tract had a population of 1,752. The racial makeup of Patterson Tract was 999 (57.0%) White, 0 (0.0%) African American, 33 (1.9%) Native American, 73 (4.2%) Asian, 0 (0.0%) Pacific Islander, 577 (32.9%) from other races, and 70 (4.0%) from two or more races. Hispanic or Latino of any race were 1,133 persons (64.7%).

The whole population lived in households, no one lived in non-institutionalized group quarters and no one was institutionalized.

There were 487 households, 239 (49.1%) had children under the age of 18 living in them, 288 (59.1%) were opposite-sex married couples living together, 65 (13.3%) had a female householder with no husband present, 48 (9.9%) had a male householder with no wife present.  There were 46 (9.4%) unmarried opposite-sex partnerships, and 1 (0.2%) same-sex married couples or partnerships. 64 households (13.1%) were one person and 19 (3.9%) had someone living alone who was 65 or older. The average household size was 3.60.  There were 401 families (82.3% of households); the average family size was 3.91.

The age distribution was 559 people (31.9%) under the age of 18, 210 people (12.0%) aged 18 to 24, 425 people (24.3%) aged 25 to 44, 375 people (21.4%) aged 45 to 64, and 183 people (10.4%) who were 65 or older.  The median age was 30.4 years. For every 100 females, there were 107.1 males.  For every 100 females age 18 and over, there were 100.8 males.

There were 521 housing units at an average density of 360.3 per square mile, of the occupied units 299 (61.4%) were owner-occupied and 188 (38.6%) were rented. The homeowner vacancy rate was 2.6%; the rental vacancy rate was 3.6%.  1,039 people (59.3% of the population) lived in owner-occupied housing units and 713 people (40.7%) lived in rental housing units.

References

Census-designated places in Tulare County, California
Census-designated places in California